Trans Arabia Airways was a Kuwaiti airline. It had its headquarters in the Karnak Building in Kuwait City.

History
The carrier started operations in  serving the Beirut–Kuwait route with a Douglas DC-4 that previously belonged to Australian National Airways. Shortly after those flights began, a second DC-4 was chartered from Starways to boost capacity in the route. In , the airline placed a provisional order for two Argosy aircraft; however, this order never materialised, and the airline ordered three Douglas DC-6Bs instead.

By , the Trans Arabia Airways fleet included three Douglas DC-6Bs to serve a route network that comprised seven destinations in the Middle East, including Bahrain, Beirut, Cairo, Damascus, Doha, Jeddah, Jerusalem, and three in Europe, including Frankfurt, London and Rome; that month, the airline was absorbed by Kuwait Airways.

See also

List of airlines of Kuwait
Transportation in Kuwait

References

Defunct airlines of Kuwait
Airlines established in 1959
Airlines disestablished in 1964
Companies based in Kuwait City
Kuwaiti companies established in 1959